Trichilia acuminata is a species of plant in the family Meliaceae. It is found in Colombia and Panama.

References

acuminata
Vulnerable plants
Flora of Colombia
Flora of Panama
Taxa named by Aimé Bonpland
Taxa named by Alexander von Humboldt
Taxonomy articles created by Polbot